Macroglossum schnitzleri is a moth of the family Sphingidae. It is known from the Moluccas.

References

Macroglossum
Moths described in 1998